Club Deportivo Everest is an Ecuadorian football team based in Guayaquil. They currently play in the third-level Segunda Categoría, but have spent ten seasons in the top-flight Serie A.

Everest is one of the nine teams in the country to win a national championship. Their only conquest came in 1962. Their trophy haul also includes one Campeonato Professional de Guayaquil title in 1960. Over the years, they have bounced over the years between the Serie A and Serie B before finally being relegated to the Segunda Categoria in 1983. They are ranked 19th in the Serie A's all-time standings.

The club was founded on February 2, 1931 under the name Círculo Deportivo Everest. They are named after the Mount Everest. The team plays their home matches in Estadio Alejandro Ponce Noboa, but often uses Estadio Modelo Alberto Spencer Herrera.

Achievements
National
Campeonato Ecuatoriano de Fútbol Serie A
Champion (1): 1962
Campeonato Ecuatoriano de Fútbol Serie B
Runner-up (1): 1979 E2
Campeonato Professional de Guayaquil
Champion (1): 1960

References

External links

 Sitio Oficial del Club Deportivo Everest 

Football clubs in Ecuador
Association football clubs established in 1931
1931 establishments in Ecuador